Angel Warriors is a 2013 Chinese action film directed by Fu Huayang and starring Collin Chou, Yu Nan, Xing Yu and Andy On. It was filmed on location in China and Thailand. The film held its premier in Beijing on 28 October 2013 and was released throughout China four days later on 1 November 2013.

Plot
Somewhere in Southeast Asia, the present day. A group of five extreme outdoor female Chinese backpackers arrives at the entrance to Kana Jungle, home of the untamed, aboriginal Tiger Tribe. The group's leader is Bai Xue (Yu Nan), a wealthy company CEO; the others are Ta (Mavis Pan), a wild animal protectionist, Yanyan (Patricia Hu), a dancer and martial artist, Tongtong (Wu Jingyi), an archaeologist and polyglot, and Bai Xue's cousin Dingdang (Wang Qiuzi), who sells outdoor clothing on the internet. All of the women have been friends since childhood; also joining them is former professional soldier Wang Laoying (Collin Chou), best friend and former comrade-in-arms of Bai Xue's late younger brother Bai Yun. Meeting them at the entrance to Kana Jungle is US-educated Dennis (Andy On), who says he's making a documentary for National Geographic, and his Tiger Tribe friend Sen (Shi Yanneng), who is engaged to Princess Haer (Wangdan Yili) and will act as guide for Dennis' group. Bai Xue's group and Dennis had met by chance in Pattaya, Thailand, three days earlier and had decided to team up. However, after they're all threatened by a tiger the first night in camp, and Dennis' men suddenly produce Uzis to scare it off, the women become suspicious and next day decide to go on their own. They're later attacked by the Tiger Tribe, and Yanyan, Dingdang and Tongtong are captured for sacrifice. Ta goes missing, but Bai Xue and Laoying try to rescue their three friends. Meanwhile, Dennis' group is also attacked by the Tiger Tribe, and only he and Sen separately survive. Dennis, whose real mission was to steal the tribe's store of precious stones, reports back to his father. Enraged, the latter decides to send in an elite force of mercenaries, led by Black Dragon (Kohata Ryu), to get the job done.

Cast
Collin Chou
Yu Nan as Bai Xue
Xing Yu
Andy On
Mavis Pan Shuang-Shuang as Ta
Wangdan Yili
Lawrence Shi
Ryu Kohata
Melrose Hu as Yan Yan
Wu Jingyi as Tongtong
Wang Qiuzi as Dingdang
Renata Tan
Roy Cheung
Rock Ji
Tang Jin

References

External links

2013 films
2013 action films
Chinese action films
2010s Mandarin-language films
Films set in China
Films shot in China
Films set in Pattaya
Films set in Thailand
Films shot in Thailand
Films directed by Fu Huayang